Tomson is both a surname and a given name. Notable people with the name include:

Surname
 Arthur Tomson (1859–1905), English artist
 Chris Tomson (b. 1984), American musician
 Jack Tomson (1918–2001), British hockey player
 Laurence Tomson (1539–1608), secretary of state to Elizabeth I of England
 Philippa Tomson (born 1978), British newsreader
 Priit Tomson (b. 1942), Estonian basketball player
 Shaun Tomson (born 1955), South African world champion surfer, environmentalist, and businessman
 William Tomson (1842–1882), English cricketer

Given name
 Tomson Highway (born 1951), Cree playwright, novelist, and children's author

Transport 

 Former callsign of TUI Airways, Thomson Airways and Thomsonfly

Surnames of English origin
Surnames from given names